Eitel Friedrich II, Count of Hohenzollern ( – 18 June 1512 in Trier, Electorate of Trier) was a count of Hohenzollern and belonged to the Swabian line of the House of Hohenzollern.  He was the first president of the Reichskammergericht.  As a close friend of the Archduke and later Emperor Maximilian I, he gained great influence in the imperial politics.  He managed to consolidate and expand his own territory.

Relationship with the Franconian line 
Eitel Friedrich II was the son and heir of Count Jobst Nikolaus I (1433–1488).  He continued his father's policy of good relationships with the Franconian line of the House of Hohenzollern, who ruled the Burgraviate of Nuremberg and the Margraviate of Brandenburg.  During his father's reign, he spent several years at the court of Elector Albrecht Achilles.  From 1481, he served as captain of the Lordship of Krosno Odrzańskie, east of the Oder.  In 1483, he became a Councillor in Brandenburg.  Later, he served as governor of Kottbus and Züllichau.

In 1482 in Berlin, he married Magdalena, the daughter of Margrave Friedrich of the Altmark, thus creating a family relationship between the two lines of Hohenzollern.  Elector Albrecht Achilles, who held some possessions in Swabia himself, protected his Swabian relatives against the powerful Counts of Württemberg, who had formed a threat to the Swabian Hohenzollerns for a long time.

Relationship with the House of Habsburg 
Eitel Friedrich II was a close friend of Maximilian I and maintained excellent relations with the House of Habsburg.  This gained great influence on imperial politics.  He provided diplomatic services for Maximilian and fought for him in the Netherlands.  He distinguished himself in the Battle of Guinegate in 1479 and in 1488, he led the vanguard against rebellious citizens of Bruges, who held the newly elected Emperor captive.

Eitel Friedrich had served Maximilan as judge and when the Reichskammergericht was established in 1495, Eitel Friedrich was its first president.  In 1497 or 1498, he was appointed as Councillor in Austria.  In 1499, Eitel Friedrich and Dietrich Blumeneck led a small army against Switzerland and conquered Rorschach on the south bank of Lake Constance.  In 1500, he occupied the County of Gorizia for Austria.  In 1501, he was awarded the Order of the Golden Fleece.

On 12 September 1504, during the Landshut War of Succession, he fought at Regensburg against Bohemia and the Palatinate.  He commanded the right wing of the cavalry and contributed significantly to the victory.

Legacy 

In 1505 Eitel Friedrich II founded the Collegiate Church in Hechingen, where a tombstone for him and his wife can be seen.

Issue 
The following children were born from the marriage of Eitel Friedrich and Magdalena of Brandenburg:
 Franz Wolfgang (1483 or 1484 – 1517), married  to Margravine Rosine of Baden (1487–1554)
 Wandelberta ( – 1551), married in 1507 to Count Albrecht III of Hohenlohe-Weikersheim (d. 1551)
 Joachim (1485 or 1486 – 1538), married in 1513 to Anastasia of Stoffeln (d. 1530)
 Maria Salome (1488–1548), married in 1507 to Count Ludwig XV of Oettingen (d. 1557)
 Eitel Friedrich III (1494–1525), his successor, married Johanna of Witthem (d. 1544)
 Anna (1496–1530), a nun

Ancestry

References 
 Martin Dressel: Graf Eitelfriedrich II. von Zollern (1452 - 1512), Gesellschaft für Reichskammergerichtsforschung, Wetzlar, 1995
 Wolfgang Neugebauer: Die Hohenzollern. Anfänge, Landesstaat und monarchische Autokratie bis 1740, vol. 1, Stuttgart, Berlin and Cologne, 1996
 
 Constantin von Wurzbach: Hohenzollern, Eitel Friedrich (IV.), in: Biographisches Lexikon des Kaiserthums Oesterreich, vol. 9, Verlag L. C. Zamarski, Vienna, 1863, p. 217

External links 
 Entry at deutschemonarchie.de

Counts of Hohenzollern
House of Hohenzollern
Knights of the Golden Fleece
1450s births
Place of birth missing
1512 deaths
Year of birth uncertain
15th-century German people